Nikola Čupin (13 November 1938 – 22 October 2018) was a Croatian rower. He competed in the men's coxless pair event at the 1960 Summer Olympics.

References

1938 births
2018 deaths
Croatian male rowers
Olympic rowers of Yugoslavia
Rowers at the 1960 Summer Olympics
People from Šibenik-Knin County